The List of West German films of 1951. This was the second full year of film production since the formal partition of Germany into East and West in 1949.

A–Z

Bibliography 
 Davidson, John & Hake, Sabine. Framing the Fifties: Cinema in a Divided Germany. Berghahn Books, 2007.
Fehrenbach, Heide. Cinema in Democratizing Germany: Reconstructing National Identity After Hitler. University of North Carolina Press, 1995.

See also
 List of Austrian films of 1951
 List of East German films of 1951

External links 
IMDB listing for West German films made in 1951
filmportal.de listing for films made in 1951

West German
Lists of German films
film